The SraL RNA ('sra' for small RNA), also known as RyjA,  is a small non-coding RNA discovered in E. coli, and later in Salmonella Tiphimurium. This ncRNA was found to be expressed only in stationary phase.   It may possibly play a role in Salmonella virulence. The major stationary phase regulator RpoS is transcriptionally regulating SraL and directly binds to the sraL gene  promoter. SraL down-regulates  the expression of the ribosome-associated chaperone Trigger Factor (TF), which is involved in the folding of the newly synthesised  cystolic proteins.

References

Non-coding RNA